Oleksandr Oleksandrovych Karavayev (born 2 June 1992) is a Ukrainian professional footballer who plays as a midfielder for Dynamo Kyiv.

Club career
Karavayev was born in Kherson, Ukraine. In 2017, he played for Fenerbahçe SK in the Süper Lig on loan from FC Shakhtar Donetsk. He signed six-month loan deal with the club.

International career
Karavayev was a member of different Ukrainian national football teams. He was a member of the Ukraine U21, called up by Pavlo Yakovenko for a friendly match against the Czech Republic on 17 November 2010.

Career statistics

Club

International

Scores and results list Ukraine's goal tally first, score column indicates score after each Karavayev goal.

Honours
Sevastopol
Ukrainian First League: 2012–13
 
Zorya Luhansk
 Ukrainian Cup: runner-up 2015–16

Dynamo Kyiv
Ukrainian Premier League: 2020–21
Ukrainian Cup: 2019–20, 2020–21
Ukrainian Super Cup: 2019, 2020

References

External links 
 
 

1992 births
Living people
Sportspeople from Kherson
Ukrainian footballers
Association football forwards
Ukraine international footballers
UEFA Euro 2016 players
UEFA Euro 2020 players
FC Shakhtar Donetsk players
FC Shakhtar-3 Donetsk players
FC Zorya Luhansk players
FC Sevastopol players
FC Dynamo Kyiv players
Ukrainian Premier League players
Ukrainian First League players
Ukrainian Second League players
Ukrainian Cup top scorers
Fenerbahçe S.K. footballers
Ukrainian expatriate footballers
Expatriate footballers in Turkey
Ukrainian expatriate sportspeople in Turkey